Arne Ervig (born June 30, 1940) is a Norwegian sprint canoer who competed in the early 1960s. He was eliminated in the semifinal round of the K-2 1000 m event at the 1960 Summer Olympics in Rome.

References
Sports-reference.com profile

1940 births
Canoeists at the 1960 Summer Olympics
Living people
Norwegian male canoeists
Olympic canoeists of Norway
Place of birth missing (living people)
20th-century Norwegian people